Divizia Naţională (Romanian: National Division), may refer to:
Moldovan National Division, association football
SuperLiga (rugby), former name of Romania's main rugby union competition